Paul Cronin (1938–2019) was an Australian actor.

Paul Cronin may also refer to:
Paul W. Cronin (1938–1997), American politician
Paul Cronin (judge) (active since 1980), Australian judge
Paul D. Cronin (active 1967–2002), American horse rider